Jacir Palace or Qasr Jacir is the largest hotel in Bethlehem in the central West Bank. The building's original design was based on typical Palestinian architecture and the characteristics of an Arab household. Jacir Palace has three floors, each spanning 800 sq m. The newly built hotel added an outdoor swimming pool, a health spa, two meeting rooms, 250 available rooms and 11 food and beverage outlets including restaurants and bars.

Jacir Palace was built in 1910 by local craftsmen on commission of the former mayor of Bethlehem, also a merchant, Suleiman Jacir (great grandfather of Nasri Jacir, Emily and Annemarie Jacir), who intended that he and his five brothers’ families would live in the mansion together. So they did for a time, however, the family went bankrupt in the 1920s and were forced to sell the palace and its furniture. Jacir Palace was eventually taken over by the British who used it as a women's prison in the 1940s. In the 1950s it was a private school called al-Ummah, later the house became a public boys school and at a still later stage was transformed into a public girls  school. The house was also used by the Israel Defence Forces, particularly during the First Intifada, as a point of control considering its advantageous location and continued to be a major point of confrontation between local stone-throwing youths and the IDF. 

In 2000, a group of Palestinian investors belonging to PEDCAR — which is linked to the Palestinian National Authority — acquired Jacir Palace; they refurbished and renovated it soon after. Munib il Masri,  father of filmmaker Mai Masri,  now owns the Palace. 
 However, the hotel was closed down from 2000 to 2005. It closed again in 2021 because of the COVID-19 epidemic, and remains shut in January 2023.

See also
Abd al-Hadi Palace
Orient House

References

Buildings and structures completed in 1910
Buildings and structures in Bethlehem
Hotels in the State of Palestine
Palaces in the State of Palestine